The 2006–07 Hellenic Football League season was the 54th in the history of the Hellenic Football League, a football competition in England.

Premier Division

The Premier Division featured 17 clubs which had competed in the division's previous season, along with five new clubs:
AFC Wallingford, promoted from the Combined Counties League Division One
Bicester Town, promoted from Division One East
Harrow Hill, promoted from Division One West
Hounslow Borough, promoted from Division One East
Thame United, relegated from the Southern Football League

League table

Division One East

Division One East featured 15 clubs which competed in the division last season, along with three new clubs:
Headington Amateurs, transferred from Division One West
Henley Town, relegated from the Premier Division
Marlow United, joined from the Reading Football League

League table

Division One West

Division One West featured 16 clubs which competed in the division last season, along with two new clubs:
Banbury United reserves, transferred from Division One East
Lydney Town, joined from the Gloucestershire County League

League table

References

External links
 Hellenic Football League

2006-07
9